The 1916 United States presidential election in Missouri was held on November 7, 1916 as part of the 1916 United States presidential election. Voters chose 18 representatives, or electors, to the Electoral College, who voted for president and vice president.

Missouri was won by incumbent President, Woodrow Wilson (D–New Jersey), running with Vice President Thomas R. Marshall, with 50.59% of the popular vote, against Supreme Court Justice Charles Evans Hughes (R–New York), running with former vice president Charles W. Fairbanks, with 46.94% of the popular vote. Had Hughes carried the state of Missouri, he would've had 272 electoral votes, enough to win the presidency.

This election was the first in which Missouri voted to the right of Kansas since the latter's statehood. This would not recur until 2020.

Results

Results by county

See also
 United States presidential elections in Missouri

References

Missouri
1916
1916 Missouri elections